Xeniamia atrithorax, is a species of cardinalfish in the family Apogonidae found in South China Sea off Khanh Hoa Province in Vietnam. This species is the only member of its genus. X. atrithorax is a possibly luminous species.

References

Apogonidae
Monotypic marine fish genera
Taxa named by Thomas H. Fraser